Rob Lotterstein is an American screenwriter and producer. He has written and produced for numerous television sitcoms including Boy Meets World, Suddenly Susan, Ellen and Will & Grace, as well as serving as creator and executive producer of the FOX sitcom The War at Home. Lotterstein also served as executive producer on the Disney Channel original series Shake It Up.

Early life 
Lotterstein was born in Roslyn, New York and raised in the Jewish faith. He graduated from George Washington University with a degree in marketing and went on to earn a master's degree in advertising from Northwestern University.

Career 
Lotterstein began his career writing commercials before landing his first job as a staff writer for HBO's Emmy Award winning show Dream On. It was during his time writing for the show Dream On that Lotterstein first began working with Ellen Idelson, who would become his writing partner for nearly the next 10 years until her death in 2003.  Some of his notable writing/producing credits include The Nanny, Boy Meets World, Suddenly Susan, Ellen, Will & Grace and Darren Star's Grosse Pointe. Lotterstein was the creator, writer, and executive producer of the show The War At Home for which he was nominated for a GLAAD Award as well as The Humanitas Prize. In 2010, he made a cameo on the FOX animated series Family Guy providing the voice of a CBS executive trying to "refine" Brian's script for a television pilot.  Lotterstein used to serve as the executive producer of the Disney Channel's dance-driven sitcom Shake It Up!.

Personal life 
Lotterstein is openly gay, and currently lives in Los Angeles with his partner, Phil Oster.

Filmography

Television

References

External links 
 

Television producers from New York (state)
American television writers
American male television writers
American gay writers
Jewish American writers
LGBT Jews
Living people
People from Roslyn, New York
Year of birth missing (living people)
Screenwriters from New York (state)
21st-century American Jews